Airfair  was a mobile travel application that checks flights and shows whether a traveler is owed compensation.

History

AirFair was developed in 2016 by Allay Logic Ltd; a Newcastle-based tech-company.

Services

Airfair offered a free flight check to see if compensation is owed. The app could indicate how much the person is owed within minutes whether the flight was delayed, cancelled or the traveler is refused boarding.

See also
 Flight cancellation and delay
 Flight Compensation Regulation 261/2004
 Airline booking ploys
 Tracking (commercial airline flight)

References

Travel technology
Application software